Oman is an Arab country on the southeastern coast of the Arabian Peninsula. 

By regional standards, Oman has a relatively diversified economy, but remains dependent on oil exports. Tourism is the fastest-growing industry in Oman. Other sources of income, agriculture and industry, are small in comparison and account for less than 1% of the country's exports, but diversification is seen as a priority by the government.

Notable firms 
This list includes notable companies with primary headquarters located in the country. The industry and sector follow the Industry Classification Benchmark taxonomy. Organizations which have ceased operations are included and noted as defunct.

See also 

 List of banks in Oman

References 

Oman